The LG VX9400 is a mobile phone manufactured by LG Electronics. The CDMA radio is supplied by Verizon Wireless in the United States. It was one of the first two phones on the market to support live mobile TV broadcasts using Qualcomm's MediaFLO technology (along with the Samsung SCH-U620). The unique design of the QVGA display allows it to swing up into landscape orientation for TV viewing. Other key features of the VX9400 includes stereo Bluetooth, an SD card slot, digital music player, EVDO high-speed data connectivity, and speakerphone.

The phone was also featured in the 2008 movie Iron Man, as the phone Tony Stark used to communicate with Obadiah about the successful presentation of a Stark Industries Jericho missile. The phone was also a significant focus in the movie Picture This starring Ashley Tisdale.
It is compatible with BitPim 1.0 and later to upload ringtones, transfer wallpapers and pictures, and to back up SMS messages, the phone book/contact list and the calendar. The current available software version is v03 and should be updated at your local Verizon store.

Specifications/Features

References

VX9400